The Binirayan Sports Complex is a sports facility complex located in San Jose de Buenavista, Antique, Philippines.

Background
The sports complex was carved out of La Granja Hill and was one of the projects of the local government under Antique governor, Evelio Javier. The venue has Western Visayas-wide major competitions

In March 2017, the laying of a new rubberized track was commenced with the help of local firm, DMCI. The works was projected to be finished in time for the 2017 Palarong Pambansa. The sports venue hosted the opening ceremony and select events of the national games as planned.

References

Athletics (track and field) venues in the Philippines
Buildings and structures in Antique (province)
Football venues in the Philippines
Sports in Antique (province)